World Series Hockey (WSH) was a professional league for field hockey competition in India. It was organised by Indian Hockey Federation and Nimbus Sports with the objective to reinvigorate hockey in India. It was contested among eight franchisee-based teams consisting of players from India and around the world. The entire event took place on home and away basis culminating into multi header playoffs. Australian Dennis Meredith, a member of the FIH panel of tournament directors is the technical director of the WSH. It is currently sponsored by tyre manufacturers, Bridgestone, and therefore officially known as Bridgestone World Series Hockey.

The inaugural season of the tournament was played between eight teams out of which Sher-e-Punjab was crowned the champion after defeating Pune Strykers 5-2 in the final. WSH became the first field hockey tournament ever to live stream all the matches online on Google's video and music sharing site YouTube.

History

First season

The inaugural season of WSH was to take place from 17 December 2011 to 22 January 2012 but later was postponed owing to Olympic qualifiers. It kicked off on 29 February amidst confusion and controversies when the Indian players opted out of the tournament and FIH, HI and PHF warned players looking to participate in the WSH that they will be suspended from international matches as the event was unsanctioned.

A total of 59 matches were played in 34 days. The top four teams in the league phase advanced to the semi-finals followed by the final which was played in Mahindra Hockey Stadium, Mumbai. Sher-e-Punjab defeated Pune Strykers 5 – 2 to become the champions of the first WSH.

Second season

The second season of World Series Hockey was supposed to be played from 15 December 2012 to 20 January 2013.

Competition format

Rules
The event was played according to traditional hockey rules apart from a few variations.

All the matches are of 70 minutes each but instead of two-halves, the games are divided into four-quarters of 17-and-a-half minutes each to give more rest to players during a game and also provide opportunities to sponsors and advertisers. Each team can have a maximum of 25 registered players out of which 18 can play. Time-outs (2 minutes) can be called by the teams, once in each half although are not mandatory. There are video umpires in all games and video referrals can be only called by umpires either at their own or as requested by a team (one per match) for goal line decision only. In the event that the referral is upheld the referring team will retain its right of referral.

Shoot-out competition between two teams is similar to the ice hockey penalty shootout. Each team has five penalty shoot-outs where five players are nominated. Each player, with the ball on the 23 m line, the goalkeeper/defending player on or behind the goal‐line between the goal posts, starts with the umpire's signal and has a maximum of eight seconds to score a goal with only the goal keeper defending the goal. The player can take as many shots possible within the stipulated eight secs. A penalty stroke is awarded in case of intentional foul by the goal-keeper. The shoot-outs are used only in the knockout stage.

Competition
World Series Hockey will be a multi city franchise-based league with the players allocated to the teams based on the internationally accepted and practiced draft system. World Series Hockey consists of eight teams representing eight cities/states of India. The Event will be played in two phases over 34 days and consist of a total of 59 matches.

League phase
Each team will play the other twice; home and away and thus will play 14 league matches; 7 home and 7 away. The League Phase will consist of 56 matches and will be played from 29 February to 2 April. Points in the league phase were awarded as follows: 3 points for a win, 1 point each for a draw and no points for a loss. Top four teams qualify for the semi-finals. If at the end of the league phase two or more teams have the same number of points, these teams will be ranked according to the following criteria:
 Respective number of matches won
 Higher number of wins
 Goal difference
 Number of goals scored
 Head to head record
 Shoot‐out competition

Playoffs
The four teams with the best record after the league phase qualify for the playoffs. In the Semis, the No.1 team plays the No. 4 team, and the No. 2 team faces No. 3 team. Each of these matches are a one match knockout and venue for this match is allocated by the Technical Director. The winners of each playoff semis qualifies for the final.

The Final is played between the winners of each of the semis. The team which wins the Final are declared the Champions.

Franchises

Players

Each team can have a maximum of 25 registered players out of which 18 can play. The tournament includes Pakistani superstar and legend Waseem Ahmad along with seven other Pakistani players. The players for the eight teams were finalized on 28 November and 10 February based on the draft system. The captains of eight city-based franchisee teams were announced at a media conference and the list includes four Indian players and four foreign players. WSH signed on eight world-renowned coaches to take charge of the teams. The coaches have been 
selected from a list of highly talented professionals primarily based on their experience with 
international teams and their exposure to the sub continent conditions.

Trophy
Trophy of Bridgestone World Series Hockey comprises a large cup with two hockey sticks on either sides. The trophy was unveiled by bollywood star Saif Ali Khan with Viren Rasquinha, Prabhjot Singh, Arjun Halappa and Rajpal Singh at a press conference in Mumbai.

Sponsorship
Tyre manufacturers Bridgestone became the title sponsors of World Series Hockey for the inaugural season.
2012–present: Bridgestone
Other major sponsors of the league include leading brands Vodafone and Seagram's Imperial Blue.

Prize money
The prize money for WSH will be the highest ever prize money for any hockey event in the 
world which is 30 times more prize money than the Euro Hockey League. The total prize money is excess of  100 million (100 Million Indian rupees). Prize Money will be as follows:

If an Indian player becomes 'WSH Rockstar', the prize for the 'Indian Superstar' will be awarded to the next best Indian player. All WSH franchises have committed to share a minimum of 50% of their team winnings with the players.

Preparations

Installation of goalposts
WSH has set international standard goalposts at every tournament venue. These goalposts are the same ones that will be used in the London Olympics in 2012, and are manufactured by Harrod UK, who are the official suppliers to the event. Harrod UK 
has been responsible for goalposts used in global sporting events, including Rugby World Cup, Delhi Commonwealth Games, Wembley Stadium, Santiago Bernabéu and Dubai Sports City. The specialty of these goalposts is that the back post is outside the net, thus not allowing balls to rebound at pace from within the goal, and leaving no doubt in decisions made by umpires on shots on goal that enter the goal.

Plan for National Team
The organisers of WSH announced huge financial rewards for Indian players who participate in the event. As per the plan, WSH-signed players who make it to the Indian team for next year's Olympic Qualifiers will get  500,000 each. If India qualify for London Olympics, these players will be given additional  500,000 each.

If Indian team returns with bronze medal from London Olympics,  5 million will be divided equally amongst all WSH-signed players in the team. The sum will be doubled to  10 million if India win silver, while the reward will be  20 million in case of a gold medal.

Preparatory camps
The preparatory camps for World Series Hockey took place from 10 December over a week. The international players and coaches arrived in India. Sun Ming (South Korea), Stephenson Lloyd James (New Zealand) and Andreu Enrich (Spain) and Pakistan players also attended the camps. The high intensity camp was specially designed by the coaches keeping in mind individual skill sets that can be synced with the team strategy.

Postpone
The organizers of World Series Hockey decided to postpone the event by two months due to uncertainty over the participation of Indian players ahead of the Olympic qualifiers. Confirming this in a release on 12 December, Nimbus Sport said the franchisee-based tournament would now be held between 29 February and 2 April. However, Hockey India officials were quick to clarify that there was no guarantee of the national squad members being available on those dates if they correspond with their preparatory camps.

Brand Ambassador
Bollywood actor Suniel Shetty is appointed as the 'Brand Ambassador' for the World Series Hockey.

Title sponsors
Tyre manufacturers Bridgestone became the Title Sponsor of World Series Hockey.

Statistics

Performance of teams

Top scorers

The top goal scorer of the league is awarded with golden stick award and a prize money of  2.5 million ( 25,000). Apart from this,  5,000 is given to the players for the goal of the match. Currently Gurjinder Singh (19 in 15 matches) and Syed Imran Warsi (19 in 14 matches) share the number one spot for most goals after the first season. Champion team Sher-e-Punjab holds the record for most goals scored (54 in 16 matches). Delhi Wizards and Bhopal Badshahs have conceded the fewest goals (37 in 14 matches).

The highest-scoring matches to date in the World Series Hockey occurred twice: First on 1 March 2012 when Pune Strykers beat Mumbai Marines and second on 30 March 2012 when Delhi defeated Punjab. Both the matches ended up 7–5. Out of Pune's 7 goals, 5 were scored by Gurpreet Singh which is also the most goals scored in a WSH match by an individual.

Technical committee
On 11 November, the technical committee for World Series Hockey was announced, which includes Dennis Meredith, former Indian coach Joaquim Carvolho, Former Captain and one of the best goalkeepers of India Ashish Ballal, former Chairman of the FIH Umpiring Committee Peter Von Reth, M.P. Ganesh, Shahbaz Ahmed and Zafar Iqbal.

The committee will be responsible for establishment of rules and regulations the WSH code of conduct for players, tournament officials and franchise owners, guidelines for offences and penalties pursuant and guidelines to the WSH Technical Director on the process for hearing and determining any reported offence.

Tina Brullo of Australia was named as the competition operations manager. Tina has over 15 years of extensive experience in managing international sports events including the last year's FIH Hockey World Cup in India.

1996 Atlanta Olympics Indian goalkeeper Alloysius Edwards was chosen as one of the managers of the World Series Hockey whereas sports medicine expert P.S.M. Chandran, involved with multiple sports at the international level for more than three decades, was elected as chief medical officer.

Controversies
The IHF is not recognised by the International Hockey Federation (FIH) as the governing body for the sport in India. The IHF has not been recognised by the FIH since 2000. Instead the FIH recognises Hockey India as the sole national governing body for hockey in India. It remains an unsanctioned event as per the FIH Statutes and Bye-Laws.

Pakistan Hockey Federation (PHF) has said that any player who participates in the WSH will be banned from domestic competitions. This declaration hinders the plans of several Pakistan hockey stars, including former captain Rehan Butt. FIH wrote a letter to PHF which clearly stated that the league is unsanctioned and national team members and players not part of the team too would not take part in it. Earlier, the FIH had stated that those who had signed their contracts before 28 March 2011 could play in the league, but now the situation has changed as FIH has termed the league unsanctioned. Apart from Rehan, Zeeshan Ashraf, Mudassar Ali, Tariq Aziz, Adnan Maqsood, Waseem Ahmad, Syed Imran Warsi and Shakeel Abbasi were signed to play in WSH.

FIH president Leandro Negre served a direct warning to players looking to participate in the WSH that they will be suspended from international matches. The entire Indian squad signed a contract to play in the league but Negre made it clear that any Indian player who participates will be banned from the Olympic qualifiers and all FIH tournaments.

Former Indian coach Harendra Singh criticized the FIH and HI that they have no right to interfere in a domestic tournament and stop players from participating in the WSH. According to him, playing in match situation is more beneficial for the players than attending camps for the Olympic qualifiers.

On 30 November, six top Indian players pulled out of the league in favor of the national camp for the Olympic qualifiers from 11 December. In a letter, addressed to Hockey India secretary Narinder Batra and signed by skipper Bharat Chettri, Tushar Khandekar, Yuvraj Walmiki, Sreejesh, Sandeep Singh and Sardar Singh, the players said they would be available for selection to the national team for the qualifiers, which would be held in the Capital in February. The organisers of the WSH, however, said that they were yet to get communication from any WSH player regarding their non-availability for the inaugural edition of the event.

On 1 December, six more Indian players pulled out of the World Series Hockey citing national camp for the Olympic qualifier that would coincide with the league starting 17 December. The six players - Rupinder Pal Singh, Danish Mujtaba, Kangujam Chinglensana Singh, Manjeet Kullu, Birendra Lakra and Manpreet Singh - in a letter assured the Hockey India that they would attend the national camp that starts 11 December in Delhi. But the IHF president RK Shetty said: "The IHF haven't received any request from the players. It is a ploy to sabotage the WSH".

Sources claimed that coach requested Hockey India to postpone camp from 11 December to sometime in January so that national players can feature in inaugural World Series Hockey. Organisers of the WSH have said they are open to postponing the event by three months, till after the Olympic Qualification tournament, following Hockey India's refusal to select those players in the Indian team who would participate in the proposed franchise-based league. The organisers postponed the event with condition of written guarantee from HI and an assurance that they will allow all the players to participate in the tournament after the qualifiers.

The tournament got clearance from Delhi High Court on 13 February adding that the schedule did not clash with international commitments of the national team.

18 players of the Indian team that qualified for the London Olympics decided to skip the league after a team meeting. International Hockey Federation said that it can sanction the WSH only if the two organisations, Hockey India (HI) and Indian Hockey Federation (IHF), reached an agreement.

Media

Broadcast rights

See also

 2012 World Series Hockey
 Hockey India League
 Premier Hockey League
 Hockey in India
 Indian National Hockey Team (Men)
 Indian National Hockey Team (Women)

References

External links
 
 World Series Hockey on SPORT195

 
Field hockey leagues in India
Professional sports leagues in India